The Gotha Go 242 was a transport glider used by the Luftwaffe during World War II. It was an upgrade over the DFS 230 in both cargo/troop capacity and flight characteristics. It saw limited combat action. There were multiple glider variants, and it became the basis for a transport aircraft, the: Gotha Go 244.

Development

The Go 242 was designed by Albert Kalkert in response to a Reichsluftfahrtministerium (RLM) requirement for a heavy transport glider to replace the DFS 230 then in service. The requirement was for a glider capable of carrying 20 fully laden troops or the equivalent cargo.

The aircraft was a high-wing monoplane with a simple square-section fuselage ending in clamshell doors used to load cargo. The empennage was mounted on twin booms linked by a tailplane. The fuselage was formed of steel tubing covered with doped fabric. The flight characteristics of the design were better than those of the DFS 230.

Cargo versions of the glider featured a hinged rear fuselage loading ramp that could accommodate a small vehicle such as a Kübelwagen or loads of similar size and weight.

Two prototypes flew in 1941 and the type quickly entered production. A total of 1,528 were built, 133 of which were converted to the Go 244, with two  Gnome-Rhône 14M engines, (a paired -04 and -05 rotating in opposite directions), fitted to forward extensions of the tail booms.

The Go 242 was tested with various rockets for overloaded take offs. A rack of four  Rheinmetall-Borsig 109-502 rockets mounted on the rear of the cargo compartment was tested but not used operationally. A second rocket, called "R-Gerät", also used with the glider, was a liquid-fuelled Walter HWK 109-500A (R I-203) Starthilfe; a podded monopropellant (T-Stoff, stabilised high test peroxide), rocket engine mounted beneath each wing and jettisoned after take-off, parachuting down to be recycled.

Operational history

In service, Go 242s were towed into the air by Heinkel He 111s or Junkers Ju 52s, and were occasionally fitted with RATO equipment. Most saw service in the Mediterranean, North Africa and Aegean. Ju 87D-2s had strengthened rear fuselage and combined tailwheel and hook for towing the Go 242.

A few gliders, the Go 242 C-1 variant, were constructed with a flying boat-style hull allowing water landings. It was proposed that some carry a small catamaran assault boat with a  explosive charge suspended between its hulls. The proposed mission profile was for the pilot to land near an enemy ship and transfer to the assault boat, setting off at high speed for the enemy ship and locking the controls before bailing out.

Surviving aircraft
Gotha Go 242 - Musée de la Resistance du Vercors. Valence, France
Gotha Go 242 C-1 - Technik Museum and Luftwaffenmuseum der Bundeswehr. Berlin, Germany

Variants
Go 242 A-1 - initial cargo-carrying version
Go 242 A-2 - initial troop-carrying version
Go 242 B-1 - cargo version with jettisonable landing gear
Go 242 B-2 - B-1 with improved landing gear
Go 242 B-3 - troop-carrying version of B-1 with double rear doors
Go 242 B-4 - troop-carrying version with doors of B-3 and landing gear of B-2
Go 242 B-5 - training version with dual controls
Go 242 C-1 - maritime assault version with flying boat-style hull. Never used operationally

Specifications (Go 242B)

See also

Notes

Further reading

External links

1940s German military transport aircraft
Glider aircraft
Go 242
High-wing aircraft
Aircraft first flown in 1941